The 41st Guangdong–Hong Kong Cup was held on 6 and 9 January 2019. Hong Kong retained the trophy, beating Guangdong 5–2 on aggregate.

Squads

Guangdong
 Head coach: Chen Yuliang
 Assistant coach: Wen Zhijun, Peng Changying, Ling Xiaojun, Pan Weiming

Hong Kong
The final 23-man squad of Hong Kong was announced on 3 January 2019.
 Head coach: Kwok Kar Lok

Match details

First leg

Second leg

Hong Kong won 5–2 on aggregate.

References

2018–19 in Hong Kong football
2019
2019 in Chinese football